Pontus Lars Mikael Åhman (born 5 December 1994) is a Swedish rally driver, who drives in the Sweden Junior Rally Championship.

In 2015 and 2016, Åhman competed in the ADAC Opel Rallye Cup and finished eighth and third.

Career results

ADAC Opel Rallye Cup results

External links

Living people
1994 births
Swedish rally drivers
Sportspeople from Uppsala